The 1934 All-Pacific Coast football team consists of American football players chosen by various organizations for All-Pacific Coast teams for the 1934 college football season.   The organizations selecting teams in 1934 included the Associated Press (AP), the Newspaper Enterprise Association, and the United Press (UP).

All-Pacific Coast selections

Quarterback
 Joe Salatino, Santa Clara (AP-1; UP-1)
 Frank Alustiza, Stanford (NEA-1)
 Muller, Stanford (AP-2)
 Ed Goddard, Washington State (UP-2)

Halfbacks
 Robert Hamilton, Stanford (AP-1; NEA-1; UP-1)
 Arleigh Williams, California (AP-1; NEA-1; UP-1)
 Frank Sobrero, Santa Clara (AP-2; UP-2)
 Clemens, USC (AP-2)
 Charles "Chuck" Cheshire, UCLA (UP-2)

Fullback
 Bobby Grayson, Stanford (AP-1; NEA-1; UP-1)
 Paul Sulkosky, Washington (AP-2; UP-2)

Ends
 Butch Morse, Oregon (AP-1; NEA-1; UP-1)
 Monk Moscrip, Stanford (AP-1; NEA-1; UP-1) (College Football Hall of Fame)
 Ed Erdelatz, St. Mary's (AP-2; UP-2)
 William Topping, Stanford (AP-2)
 Louis O'Bryan, Loyola (UP-2)

Tackles
 Bob Reynolds, Stanford (AP-1; NEA-1; UP-1) (College Football Hall of Fame)
 George Theodoratus, Washington State (AP-2; NEA-1; UP-1)
 Jim Barber, San Francisco University (AP-1)
 Claude Callaway, Stanford (AP-2)
 Jim Barber, Univ. of San Francisco (UP-2)
 John Yezerski, St. Mary's (UP-2)

Guards
 Verdi Boyer, UCLA (AP-1; NEA-1; UP-1)
 Charles Mucha, Washington (AP-1; NEA-1; UP-1)
 Louis Spadefore, Santa Clara (AP-2; UP-2)
 Lawrence Rouble, Stanford (AP-2)
 Frank Stojack, Washington State (UP-2)

Centers
 Larry Siemering, San Francisco University (AP-1; UP-1)
 Wes Muller, Stanford (AP-2; NEA-1; UP-2)

Key
AP = Associated Press, selected by "a jury of nearly 60 sports writers, coaches and officials"

NEA = Newspaper Enterprise Association, selected by NEA sports writers in the Far West

UP = United Press, selected by a board "composed of leading sports writers of the coast and United Press writers who covered the games during the season"

Bold = Consensus first-team selection of the majority of the selectors listed above

See also
1934 College Football All-America Team

References

All-Pacific Coast Football Team
All-Pacific Coast football teams
All-Pac-12 Conference football teams